Verywell is a website providing health and wellness information by health professionals. It was launched on 26 April 2016 as a media property of About.com (now Dotdash Meredith) and its first standalone brand. Its content is created by 120 health experts and reviewed by board-certified physicians.

Verywell is a vertical site focused on health. As of March 2017, it reached 17 million US unique users each month.

History

About.com launched Verywell as its first standalone media property on 26 April 2016. The site took about half the health content  already present at About.com, but the content was updated and made easier to read and navigate. The website hired Dr. David L. Katz as its first senior medical advisor. Verywell launched a partnership with the Cleveland Clinic in August 2016, helping promote content from the clinic's consumer health information portal. The second phase of the partnership, launched in January 2017, focused on providing resources to physicians and doctors.

By May 2017, About.com had transformed into Dotdash, an umbrella media brand of six distinct and specialized vertical sites ("content destinations"). While Verywell was about health, the others were about travel, learning, money management, home decorating, and technology.

Website

The website is maintained by 120 health experts, including doctors, trainers, dietitians, specialists, and other professionals, with the content being reviewed and approved by board-certified physicians.

Verywell has been recognized for its "fun, energetic tone," diverging from the starkly clinical feel of most health portals. This has been a deliberate strategy on part of Dotdash,  with the website advising the visitors to "think of us as your friend who also happens to be a doctor."

Verywell was followed by similar websites made by major news portals such as NBC News, HuffPost, Time Inc., The New York Times and CalmSage.

The website has split into four sites: Verywell Health (the main domain), Verywell Fit, Verywell Family, and Verywell Mind.

Traffic

As of March 2017, Verywell ranked in the top 10 health information sites, reaching 17 million US unique users each month. 

The site has a multiplatform audience, which also includes traffic from DailyBurn and Cleveland Clinic. It is mostly search-dependent, as 70 percent of its monthly desktop traffic comes from search results. Verywell claims that 15 percent of its traffic is direct, an increase compared to the period when its content was part of About.com (8 percent).

References

External links
 

Internet properties established in 2016
2016 establishments in the United States
American medical websites